Scopula praecanata is a moth of the  family Geometridae. It is found in Tibet and central China (Sichuan).

References

Moths described in 1896
praecanata
Moths of Asia